Arnold Maria Hansson (10 November 1889 – 5 September 1981) was a New Zealand forestry administrator and consultant. He was born in Drammen, Norway on 10 November 1889.

References

1889 births
1981 deaths
People from Drammen
Norwegian emigrants to New Zealand
New Zealand foresters